The Brandner E-300 was an Egyptian turbojet engine, developed for the Helwan HA-300 light jet fighter.

Development
Austrian engineer Ferdinand Brandner, who had worked in the Soviet Union, leading the development of the Kuznetsov NK-12 turboprop, the powerplant of the Tupolev Tu-95 bomber, moved to Egypt to lead a team to design an engine to power the Helwan HA-300 jet fighter that was simultaneously being designed by a team of Germans led by Willy Messerschmitt.

The new engine underwent bench testing in 1963, and was flight tested under the wing of an Antonov An-12, before being installed in a HAL HF-24 Marut for high speed testing, in which form it flew on 29 March 1967.  The E-300 was installed in the third HA-300 prototype (the first two were powered by Bristol Siddeley Orpheus engines), but attempts to fly it were unsuccessful. The programme of HA-300 was abandoned in May 1969.

Variants
E-300-A
Military version for HA-300
E-300-C1
Civil version of E-300-A, proposed for Project 206 three-engined airliner.
E-300-C2
Proposed growth version of E-300-C1.
E-300-AF
Projected turbofan development.

Specifications (variant)

References

Bibliography
Taylor, John W. R. Jane's All The World's Aircraft 1969-70. London:Jane's Yearbooks, 1969.

External links

1960s turbojet engines